The 2006–07 USHL season is the 28th season of the United States Hockey League as an all-junior league. The regular season began on October 5, 2006, and concluded on April 14, 2007, with the regular season champion winning the Anderson Cup. The 2006–07 season added the Ohio Junior Blue Jackets as an expansion team.

The 2007 Clark Cup playoffs featured all twelve teams playing in division-based seven-game series in the opening round, followed by a quarterfinal round-robin where the winners of the opening round play each other team once. The semifinal match-ups were made by pitting the top teams in the two round-robin series against the second-place team from the opposite division in a single-elimination game with the two victors meeting in a single-game championship match.

Regular season
Final standings
Note: GP = Games played; W = Wins; L = Losses; OTL = Overtime losses; SL = Shootout losses; GF = Goals for; GA = Goals against; PTS = Points; x = clinched playoff berth; y = clinched division title; z = clinched league title

East Division

West Division

Clark Cup Playoffs

The first two rounds are restricted to intra-division matchups.

Opening Round

East Division
Waterloo Black Hawks vs. Chicago Steel

Waterloo wins best-of-seven series 4 games to 1

Cedar Rapids RoughRiders vs. Ohio Junior Blue Jackets

Cedar Rapids wins best-of-seven series 4 games to 0

Indiana Ice vs. Green Bay Gamblers

Indiana wins best-of-seven series 4 games to 0

West Division
Omaha Lancers vs. Des Moines Buccaneers

Des Moines wins best-of-seven series 4 games to 1

Tri-City Storm vs. Sioux City Musketeers

Tri-City wins best-of-seven series 4 games to 3

Lincoln Stars vs. Sioux Falls Stampede

Sioux Falls wins best-of-seven series 4 games to 0

Quarterfinals

East Division
Round-Robin

Indiana advances as the top seed from the east with Waterloo as the second seed

West Division
Round-Robin

Des Moines advances as the top seed from the west with Sioux Falls as the second seed

Final Four

Players

Scoring leaders

Leading goaltenders

Awards

Coach of the Year: P.K. O'Handley Waterloo Black Hawks
Curt Hammer Award: Zach Redmond Sioux Falls Stampede
Defenseman of the Year: Jeff Petry Des Moines Buccaneers
Executive of the Year: Michael Schupay Indiana Ice
Forward of the Year: Phil DeSimone Sioux City Musketeers
General Manager of the Year: Mike Hastings Omaha Lancers
Goaltender of the Year: Drew Palmisano Omaha Lancers
Organization of the Year: Waterloo Black Hawks
Player of the Year: Phil DeSimone Sioux City Musketeers
Rookie of the Year: Max Pacioretty Sioux City Musketeers

First Team All-Stars
 Matt DiGirolamo (Goalie) Waterloo Black Hawks
 Derrick LaPoint (Defense) Green Bay Gamblers
 Jeff Petry (Defense) Des Moines Buccaneers
 Phil DeSimone (Forward) Sioux City Musketeers
 Jared Brown (Forward) Lincoln Stars
 Jacob Cepis (Forward) Omaha Lancers

Second Team All-Stars
 Drew Palmisano (Goalie) Omaha Lancers
 Colby Cohen (Defense) Lincoln Stars
 Nick Petrecki (Defense) Omaha Lancers
 Richard Purslow (Forward) Des Moines Buccaneers
 James Marcou (Forward) Waterloo Black Hawks
 Carter Camper (Forward) Lincoln Stars

References

External links
Official website of the United States Hockey League
2006-07 USHL Season (Hockey DB)
2006-07 USHL Season (Elite Prospects)

USHL
United States Hockey League seasons